Unanimated are a Swedish melodic death metal band.

History
The band formed in Stockholm and dissolved in 1996. They have 7 current complete members. Largely inspired by Dismember, they made two melodic death metal albums. In 1993, In the Forest of the Dreaming Dead was released on Pavement Music, a label which has since merged with Crash Music Inc. The album was one of the first melodic death metal albums of all time. In 1995 Ancient God of Evil was released on No Fashion Records, an independent Swedish label. The band also contributed to the 1996 Slayer tribute Slatanic Slaughter II with their cover of "Dead Skin Mask". Their music exemplifies the melodic Swedish sound and though primarily death metal, a black metal influence stands out.  Former members have gone on to contribute to various other projects, most notably Therion, Entombed, and Dismember.  In 2007, they reformed, and in April 2008, signed to Regain Records. The band has released a new album, titled "In The Light Of Darkness", in April 2009.
In 2011, after 20 years, drummer Peter Stjärnvind decided to part ways with the band. He was then replaced with Unleashed drummer Anders Schultz.
In 2012, they announced that they were working on new material for a new album. In 2018, they announced on their Facebook page that they had signed a 3 album worldwide deal with Century Media records and that a new album would be released in the year.

Discography
Studio albums
 In the Forest of the Dreaming Dead (1993)
 Ancient God of Evil (1995)
 In the Light of Darkness (2009)
 Victory in Blood (2021)

EPs
 Annihilation (2018)

Demos
 Rehearsal Demo 1990 (1990)
 Fire Storm (1991)

Band members

Current line-up
 Johan Bohlin – guitars (1988–1996, 2007–present)
 Richard Cabeza – vocals (1988–1991), bass (1990–1991, 1993–1996, 2007–present)
 Micke Broberg – vocals (1991–1996, 2007–present)
 Anders Schultz – drums (2011–present)
 Jonas Deroueche – guitars (2016–present)

Former members
 Tim Strandberg – bass (1988–1990)
 Peter Stjärnvind – drums (1988–1996, 2007-2011)
 Chris Alvarez – guitars (1988–1990)
 Jonas Mellberg – guitars (1991–1996)
 Daniel Lofthagen – bass (1993)
 Jocke Westman – keyboards (live 1993)

Timeline

References

External links
 Unanimated MySpace
 Unanimated at MusicMight
 
 

Swedish melodic death metal musical groups
Blackened death metal musical groups
Musical groups established in 1989
Musical groups disestablished in 1996
Musical groups reestablished in 2007
Musical quintets